William Martin Larkin (20 December 1903 – 1 July 1971) was an Australian rules footballer who played with  and  in the Victorian Football League (VFL).

Family
The son of Michael Edward Larkin (1855–1929) and Catherine Ann Larkin, nee McGlone (1863–1939), William Martin Larkin was born at Numurkah on 20 December 1903.

Football

Later life
In 1931 he married Margaret Ellen Waide and they had two children together. 

William Martin Larkin died in 1971 and is buried at Melbourne General Cemetery.

Notes

External links 

1903 births
1971 deaths
Australian rules footballers from Victoria (Australia)
Western Bulldogs players
Hawthorn Football Club players